Mġarr is a harbour town in south-eastern Gozo, Malta.

History

The town of Mġarr grew up around the shallow harbour which shares its name. Ferry services to Malta were in operation by 1241, and fishing was already established. Whilst the area around the harbour was developed over the following centuries, there was little development of the harbour itself until 1841, when a breakwater was constructed to provide more shelter to the port. This breakwater was strengthened and extended several times up to 1906. A larger breakwater was constructed between 1929 and 1935, and two more in 1969; on the completion of the latter, the area of the port was expanded to 121,400 square metres.

The ferry terminal was rebuilt at a cost of €9.3 million in the early 21st century. Work began in 2001 and took seven years, with the terminal opening in February 2008. The harbour now has facilities for around 600 passengers and 200 cars. The design of the new harbour was changed during the construction process to reduce its visual impact on the surrounding landscape.

Economy and facilities
Mġarr is the largest fishing village on Gozo. In addition to the ferry terminal, a yacht marina is also located in the town. Mġarr is overlooked by Fort Chambray, constructed in 1749 by the Knights of St. John.

In May 2010, it was announced that the marina would be privatised. Operation transferred to the Harbour Management Company Limited, who intend to modernise the marina.

The Gleneagles Bar, which stands next to the original jetty in the harbour, was constructed as a cabin for ferry passengers in 1732 and has a unique sloping roof.

Transport
Mġarr is linked by ferry services to Ċirkewwa and Valletta on Malta and to the island of Comino. Buses run to Victoria and Marsalforn.

References

Towns in Malta
Geography of Malta
Gozo
Għajnsielem
Ports and harbours of Malta